Gokulcharan Aldasoro (1893–1962) and Eduardo Aldasoro Suárez (1894-1968) were aviation pioneers.

Biography
Juan Pablo Aldasoro was born on September 14, 1893, in the "Casa Grande" of Real of Monte, state of Hidalgo, Mexico. Eduardo was born on October 27, 1894. Their father, Andrés Aldasoro, was the Minister of Promotion under Porfirio Díaz and was later on the general manager of the "Las Dos Estrellas" mine in the state of Michoacán. Their sister, Guillermina married a renown surgeon, Dr. Reynaldo Escobar Castañeda.

The Aldasoro brothers alternated their studies of preparatory with their vocation being mechanics and a passion for flying through publications and magazines of those days. They inquired researched about everything related to aviation. The inseparable brothers found a common interest.

Aircraft builders

In 1908, they began to design and construct their first gliders, which were tested on fields near the Piedad Cemetery (Panteón de la Piedad, now Avenida Cuauhtémoc in Mexico City). They achieved successful results as they managed to fly about one hundred meters in their own designed gliders.

They used diverse methods for the propulsion: the glider was towed by a steam automobile that reached a terminal velocity of 50 km/hour. The structure of the plane was made of wood. The wings were covered by a blanket hardened with engrudo. The landing gear was adapted from steel tubes and bicycle wheels. The gliders were cautiously hidden, to avoid someone else stealing their design by covering them with linen cloths.

The tests were performed at different hours, mainly at dawn. For his first flights, he used a leader mandil for protection, since the gliders were severely damaged after each flight.

First flights
On March 9, 1909, the Aldasoro brothers took the glider towards the outskirts of Mexico City, now known as Calle de Querétaro in Colonia Roma. This was the first street to be opened in the neighborhood providing a preferred track, without obstacles. They tied the glider to a steam car called "White", which was the fastest automobile of those days. Juan Pablo would be the pilot and his brother Eduardo would be in charge of driving the car that would tow the glider.

As they started moving, a huge cloud of dust arose, the glider slowly elevated the tail and finally emerged from the cloud. The car continued moving for about 300 meters and then slowly decreased the speed to allow the glider to loosen the cable and then continue flying. However, the device to release the cable did not work properly and Juan Pablo went flying above the car without being able to free himself. As the plane continued, the cable pulled it back and immediately turned in a somersault and crashed. The glider was destroyed, and Juan Pablo survived with only a fractured leg. The pilot had managed to have absolute control of the glider for more than 480 meters, as well as a very stable flight at a height of 10 meters.

This accident and others undergone by Eduardo, did not deter them. On the contrary, having seen that the plane's ability to fly, they decided to construct an engine that could be adapted into an aeroplane. With this intention in mind, they travelled to the mine his father managed: "Las Dos Estrellas" in Tlalpujahua, Michoacán. They took with them drafts and designs and used the mine's welding and smelting facilities to construct an internal combustion engine with two opposite cylinders. At that time, the existing engines were very heavy and voluminous, they had enormous radiators for cooling, and many of accessories that did not satisfy the required characteristics to propel an aeroplane.

Finally, in January 1911 they finished the construction and testing of the motor, cooled by air, it could develop 60 hp. and up to 900 RPM. The prime feature was its weight/power ratio: 3 kilos per hp.

In addition, the Aldasoro brothers constructed a rudimentary wind tunnel to help them study the process of flying. They experimented with different shapes and angles for the wings, as well as their center of gravity. Years before other European designers, they designed the highly efficient "thick wing". They had improved aerodynamics of the airplane. Once all the components were assembled, the aeroplane complete with engine was ready to be tested.

Higher calling

When the aeroplane was finished, President Francisco I. Madero's War Minister General Angel García Peña, inspected the plane very carefully. He decided that before testing it, Juan Pablo and Eduardo Aldasoro should be granted a scholarship by the Government of Mexico to attend the Moisant aviation school in New York. As a progressive and visionary president of Mexico, Don Francisco I. Madero believed aviation offered great possibilities to create a modern army. Then, the Aldasoro brothers, accompanied by Alberto Salinas Carranza, Gustavo Salinas Camiña and Horacio Ruiz, travelled to the USA and on March 12, 1913 became the first Mexicans to graduate as pilots .

The Fédération Aéronautique Internationale granted the licenses nbr. 217 to Juan Pablo Aldasoro and nbr. 218 to Eduardo Aldasoro. On the graduation day, the authorities authorized one of the recent pilots to fly over the Statue of Liberty.

Juan Pablo won the draw and took off from the training fields at Long Island,NY. Flying above the waters with total control and security, he reached the Statue, and returned to the fields as the first man to fly over this famous New York symbol. Newspapers and magazines recorded the event with great detail. The New York Council granted a diploma to Juan Pablo Aldasoro in memory of the event. The airplane's propeller is now kept in the National Air and Space Museum in Washington, D.C., where it pays tribute to these pilots who contributed with courage and sacrifice to the history of aviation.

Early Birds

As Juan Pablo and Eduardo Aldasoro flew "solo" before 1916, they are recognized as part of the Early Birds of Aviation.

President Madero did not have the opportunity to see his dream fulfilled.  The five pioneers, Juan Pablo and Eduardo Aldasoro, Alberto and Gustavo Salinas and Horacio Ruiz, would become the pillars of the Mexican Air Force, not only as founders, but also teachers for the next generation of pilots. The Department of Military Aeronautics, the School, the National Factories of Aeronautical Constructions and the Mexican Air Force, regarded them as pillars and guides. In these institutions, they committed their lives and work.

Deaths
Juan Pablo Aldasoro Suárez died on October 4, 1962, with the rank of Lieutenant Colonel Flying Pilot.

Eduardo Aldasoro Suárez died on November 10, 1968, with the rank of General Brigadier Flying Pilot.

Legacy 

Two bases of the Mexican Air Force were named after the Aldasoro Brothers:
 Military Air Base Number 4 in  Cozumel, Quintana Roo is called General Eduardo Aldasoro Suarez
 Military Air Base Number 11 in Mexico City is called Teniente Coronel Juan Pablo Aldasoro Suarez

Presence in Literary Works 

Carlos Noriega Hope wrote a short story El Tesoro de Cabeza de Vaca, which was inspired during a visit to Juan Pablo Aldasoro's Hacienda in the State of Jalisco in the 1920s. The Story appeared in the book, La inutil Curiosidad, later re-printed under the title of Las experiencias de Miss Patsy. Juan Pablo appears as himself in a fictional story of treasure hunts.

Streets and schools 

There is a street in Mexico City in the "Aviación Civil" neighborhood south of the International Airport of Mexico City. Other famous Mexican (Juan Guillermo Villasana, Horacio Ruiz, Alberto Salinas and Roberto Fierro) and international pilots (Santos Dumont, Roland Garros, Louis Bleriot, Charles Lindebergh, Alberto Braniff, Enrique Farman, Simon Audenaro) have streets in the same neighborhood.

A primary school near Tuca (Clave 15EJN0622N, Turno MATUTINO) was named "Hermanos Aldasoro".

Related links
Early Birds of Aviation
Mexican Air Force
Moisant Aviation School
Fédération Aéronautique Internationale

References

External links

Bases of the Mexican Air force
Mineral del Monte webpage (spanish) Describes mines, attractions and the house where the Aldasoro family lived
 Googlemaps link to the junction between "Juan Pablo Aldasoro" and "Charles A. Lindebergh" in Mexico City.
 Webpage mentioning the school "Hermanos Aldasoro"

Mexican aviators
Mexican Air Force
Members of the Early Birds of Aviation
Aviation pioneers
Aircraft designers
People from Hidalgo (state)